The New Zealand Music Award for Best Electronic Artist is an Aotearoa Music Award that honours New Zealand artists for outstanding dance-pop and electronica recordings.

The inaugural award was presented as Best Electronica Album in 2002 to Sola Rosa for their album Solarized. The following year the award was renamed Best Dance Album, then in 2004 the award was again renamed, this time to Best Dance/Electronica Album. In 2010 the award reverted to Best Electronica Album, and from 2016 it became Best Electronic Album. In 2017 the award was changed to Best Electronic Artist with the entry criteria changed to require either an album or a minimum of five single releases in the eligibility period.

Salmonella Dub and Concord Dawn have each won the award twice, while Shapeshifter has been nominated six times but won only once.

Recipients

Best Electronica Album (2002)

Best Dance Album (2003)

Best Dance/Electronica Album (2004 to 2009)

Best Electronica Album (2010 to 2015)

Best Electronic Album (2016)

Best Electronic Artist /  Te Kaipuoro Tāhiko Toa  (2017 to current)

References

Best Dance Electronica Album
Awards established in 2003
Dance music awards